The Center for Italian Modern Art is an American art museum and research center in the SoHo district of Manhattan, in New York. It specializes in Italian modern and contemporary art. It was started in 2013, and is a 501(c)(3) organization. It publishes an online journal, Italian Modern Art, and offers fellowships for study at the center or in Italy.

Exhibitions 

The center mounts an annual exhibition. In 2017–2018 twenty-two paintings by Alberto Savinio were shown. Work by Marino Marini was exhibited in 2019–2020; six large and several small nude sculptures dating from the 1940s were shown. In 2021 the exhibition was of paintings from the 1960s by Mario Schifano.

References 

Art museums and galleries in New York City